The women's 5000 metres event at the 1995 Summer Universiade was held on 29 August at the Hakatanomori Athletic Stadium in Fukuoka, Japan. It was the first time that this event was contested at the Universiade, replacing the 3000 metres.

Results

References

Athletics at the 1995 Summer Universiade
1995 in women's athletics
1995